Friedrich Viktor Strauß, from 1852 von Strauß, and from 1872 von Strauß und Torney (Bückeburg, 18 September 1809 – 1 April 1899 in Dresden) was a princely minister, church poet, and Ehrenbürger of Dresden. He had a D. theol. degree from Leipzig University, and was known as a scholar of religious history and translator from Chinese. In 1870 he published the first German translation of the Tao Te Ching, and in 1880 the first complete German translation of the Classic of Poetry.

He made a contribution to Germany gypsy romance literature genre with the story of Tuvia Panti, in the tragicomic novella Mitteilungen aus den Akten betreffend den Zigeuner Tuvia Panti aus Ungarn (1871).

References

1809 births
1899 deaths
German nobility
Viktor